Fyksesund is a fjord in the municipality of Kvam in Vestland county, Norway. It sits between the villages of Øystese and Ålvik, and it is surrounded by the Fyksesund Landscape Park. The fjord is spanned by the Fyksesund Bridge, which was opened by Crown Prince Olav in 1937.

See also
 List of Norwegian fjords

References

Fjords of Vestland
Kvam